Dashang Group, headquartered in Dalian, Liaoning Province, China, operates department stores, Xinmate (New Mart) supermarkets and other retail business. It is the largest retailer in Northeast China.

General
Dashang Group with its headquarters in Dalian, Liaoning Province, operates Dalian Market in central Dalian, that includes Xinmate (New Mart) department store & super market, Jiajia Square (for refurbishing materials), Dalian MYKAL (Dalian MYCAL formerly), Dashang Qiulin Women's Store and Dashang Men's Store.

Dashang Group operates 150 retail stores in Dalian, has retail stores in 150 cities in eleven provinces, employs 170,000 people, and had a gross revenue of 62,500,000,000 yuan.  It is the largest retailer in Northeast China. In 2005, it acquired Harbin No. 1 Department Store in Harbin, Heilongjiang Province.

Dashang Group is listed in Shanghai Stock Exchange (600694).

References

External links
 Dashang Group web site (in Chinese)

See also
 Dalian

Retail companies of China
Companies based in Dalian
Retail companies established in 1995
Companies listed on the Shanghai Stock Exchange
Chinese brands